The Kanaka Bridge, is an under construction 2 lane bridge over the Kanaka river (near Mantam lake) at Dzongu village in the Mangan subdivision of Sikkim state in India.

Kanaka Bridge is a two-lane steel bridge likely to be completed in 2021. The bridge is Under the Road and Bridge Department, Government of Sikkim. The Construction is awarded to Siliguri-based company Mohindra Tubes Limited at the cost of INR 88.5cr. The bridge will be joining the 13 villages and better connectively for Indian army.
The bridge runs over river Rongyong damming which Mantam lake was created. The side of the lake is a vast pebbly area where people usually do camp or picnic. The dust created from the pebbles due to weathering of the river is used as sand here. At the end of the bridge there is a village named Kiem and from there if you walk for 3/4 km there is Lingdem Hotspring.

Technical details
The technical data of the bridge is as follows:

Deck height (height above river bed): 115 m (377 ft), (height above river surface): 160 m (520 ft)
Bridge length: 255 m (837 ft), 
Arch span: 217 m (712 ft) 
Arch length: 223 m (732 ft) 
Load capacity: 70R
Lane: 2
No. of foundation : 2
Design approved by: IIT Mumbai

Nearby
Nearest city: Gangtok, Sikkim
Nearest Airport: Pakyong Airport,
Nearest Railways station: New Jalpaiguri Junction railway station

References

Bridges in Sikkim
Transport in Sikkim
Road bridges in India
Steel bridges
Arch bridges